Vince Courtney was an Australian songwriter, entertainer, singer and radio personality during the vaudeville era. Born in Newcastle, New South Wales in 1887. He was prominent in the early twentieth century.
  He was born in Newcastle, New South Wales.
Although it is unusual for an Australian artist, Courtney was regarded as universally published and a household word from his gramophone recordings and radio broadcasts 

He often performed with his wife, Eva. For several years he was a key member of impersonator revue Stiffy and Mo, with fellow vaudeville personality Roy Rene. He contributed songs to pantomime The Bunyip (1916). Many of his songs were written for other leading variety performers.

On 17 August 1951 he collapsed in a Dubbo hotel lobby and died suddenly. He is buried in Randwick, New South Wales.

Works 

 The Silver in My Mother's Hair 
 Back to Virginia
 Dear Old Mother Machree
 The Cold North Sea 
 There never was love like mother's love
 That little home among the hills – Orchestrated for sextet 
 She was like the blue in heaven
 Our flag never shall come down
 Boggabri
 Mexico
 Corroboree Rag (1916) in The Bunyip Pantomime

Recordings 

 Isobel (1927) 
 That little home among the hills (1920) 
 My Home (1925) 
 Jane O'Hara (1925) 
 1962 The Silver in My Mother's Hair  with Slim Dusty

References

Australian male composers
Australian composers
Composers for piano
Australian musical theatre composers
Composers
Australian singer-songwriters
Male jazz musicians
Australian male singer-songwriters
1951 deaths